Pavin may refer to:

 Pavin (surname)
 Pavane, also spelled "pavin", a slow processional dance
 Pavin of Le Mans (Paduinus), French monk, see the chronological list of saints and blesseds in the 8th century